Sir Arthur William Steuart Cochrane  (27 April 1872 – 11 January 1954) was a long-serving Officer of Arms at the College of Arms in London.

Biography
Arthur Cochrane was the third son of Rev. David Crawford Cochrane, Master of Etwall Hospital (almshouses) and his wife Jane Tomlinson. He was born at Etwall Lodge and educated at Repton School. After serving for a term as secretary to Sir Alfred Scott-Gatty, Garter King of Arms, his heraldic career began on 19 July 1904 when he was appointed Rouge Croix Pursuivant of Arms in Ordinary. Cochrane took part in the coronation of King George V and was made MVO in 1911. In 1915 he was promoted to the office of Chester Herald of Arms in Ordinary and held this office until 1926 when he was promoted to Norroy King of Arms. Two years later, on the death of Gordon Ambrose de Lisle Lee, Cochrane was chosen to succeed him as Clarenceux King of Arms on 26 July 1928. Cochrane was made CVO in 1931 and in 1934, was appointed Advisor on Naval Badges in succession to Major Foulkes its originator.  Commander P K Kemp, naval archivist and a fellow member of the committee wrote in The Times "Meetings of the Ships Badges Committee with Sir Arthur present were always a delight, for his sense of humour was keen and contagious and his deep and intimate knowledge of heraldic matters was always freely at the disposal of those of us on the committee who fancied themselves as amateur kings of arms." Since then, the post has been held by an officer of the College of Arms. Cochrane took part in the coronation of King George VI in 1937 and was knighted that year. He also took part in the coronation of Queen Elizabeth II in 1953 and held the office of Clarenceux until his own death in 1954.

Cochrane had many interests apart from heraldry. For nearly 30 years he served on the Court of the New England Company—a charity originally set up by Oliver Cromwell to evangelise the native inhabitants of North America. He was Governor of the Company from 1938 and never missed a meeting. His main active sport was shooting, but he took a lifelong interest in cricket and followed most other games with devotion. He was for many years a member of the MCC and a well-known figure in the pavilion at Lords. He was devoted to his old school and was president of the Reptonian Society. From 1950, Cochrane also served as the first Patron of the Cambridge University Heraldic and Genealogical Society. Andrew Noble described him as "a man of great charm and an engaging companion with an encyclopaedic knowledge of pedigrees." He was a tall distinguished figure and his leonine head made him easily recognisable at State occasions

Cochrane married Margaret Peregrina Ilbert (1882–1952) the fourth daughter of Sir Courtenay Ilbert, clerk to the House of Commons at St Margaret's Westminster on 15 May 1907. They had six children, but his son David disappeared while walking in Greece in 1931, and a daughter Myrtilla died in 1933. A second son Francis died of wounds received in action at El Alamein in 1942. His surviving daughters were married to Sir John Winnifrith (permanent secretary at the Ministry of Agriculture) and Alec Peterson (pioneer in international education). Cochrane was the brother of Alfred Cochrane cricketer and author and Charles Walter Hamilton Cochrane of the Federated Malay States service.

Arms

See also
College of Arms

References

External links
The College of Arms
CUHAGS Officer of Arms Index
His armorial shield

1872 births
1954 deaths
People educated at Repton School
English officers of arms
British genealogists
Knights Commander of the Royal Victorian Order
Arthur